Adolf Hitler (1889–1945) was the leader of Nazi Germany from 1933 to 1945.

Hitler may also refer to:

Books
Hitler: Speeches and Proclamations, a series compiling Adolf Hitler's speeches
Hitler: A Study in Tyranny, a book British historian Sir Alan Bullock, published in 1952, the first major biography in English
The Hitler Book, a 2005 publication based on a secret Soviet report about Adolf Hitler
Hitler: A Short Biography, a 2012 short biography by A. N. Wilson
Hitler (Ullrich books), a two-volume biography by Volker Ullrich

Film and television

Adolf Hitler 
 Hitler (1962 film), a film starring Richard Basehart
 Hitler: A Film from Germany, a 1978 film co-produced by the BBC
 Hitler – Beast of Berlin, a 1939 film
 Hitler: The Last Ten Days, a 1973 film
 Hitler: The Rise of Evil, a 2003 TV series broadcast by CBS

Other films 
 Hitler (1996 film), a Malayalam film
 Hitler (1997 film), a Telugu film
 Hitler och vi på Klamparegatan, a Swedish film starring Chatarina Larsson
 Hitler (1998 film), a Hindi film
 Meet the Hitlers, 2014 documentary film

Other uses
Adolf Hitler (calypso), a song
Hitler (name), a surname, and a list of people with the name
Hitler (retail store), the former name of a clothing store in Gujarat, India

See also 
 Springtime for Hitler, the play in The Producers
 Hitler moustache
 Reductio ad Hitlerum, a logical fallacy in which an argument is connected to Hitler
 Hitler Didi, a 2011 Indian soap opera on Zee TV
 Elvis Hitler, an American psychobilly band
 Hilter, a municipality in Lower Saxony, Germany
 Mr. Hilter and the Minehead by-election, a Monty Python sketch
 Hiller (disambiguation)
 
 
, Namibian politician and councillor of Ompundja Constituency